"In My Eyes" is a song written by Barbara Wyrick, and originally recorded by Conway Twitty on his 1982 album Dream Maker. It was released by American country music artist John Conlee in October 1983 as the second single and title track from his album In My Eyes.  The song was Conlee's fifth number one on the country chart.  The single went to number one for one week and spent a total of fifteen weeks on the country chart.

Charts

Weekly charts

Year-end charts

References

1983 singles
1982 songs
Conway Twitty songs
John Conlee songs
Songs written by Barbara Wyrick
MCA Nashville Records singles